Stephen Raymond Nolan (born 20 August 1973) is a Northern Irish radio and television presenter for BBC Northern Ireland and BBC Radio 5 Live, and is the highest earning broadcaster that the BBC employ in the Province.

Early life
Born in the Shankill Road area of Belfast, Nolan was educated at the Royal Belfast Academical Institution and the Queen's University of Belfast, where he studied French and Business Studies, graduating with a BA in 1995.

Career

Radio
In 2002, Nolan joined Belfast CityBeat, where he won a Sony Radio Academy Award. The following year, he was hired by BBC Northern Ireland, where he has worked since 2003, presenting The Stephen Nolan Show on BBC Radio Ulster.

Since 16 July 2005, Nolan has presented his own weekend phone-in show for BBC Radio Five Live, airing from 10 pm to 1 am every Friday and Sunday, and from 9pm to 12am every Saturday. Until 2017, he also hosted Question Time Extra Time, a simulcast of BBC One's Question Time, followed by a continuation of debates on Five Live.

In 2006, Nolan was involved in a mock boxing match with Gerry Anderson in aid of the BBC's Children in Need appeal.

On 13 October 2021, he launched a podcast, Nolan Investigates.

Television
Nolan has presented several television programmes. Nolan Live on BBC Northern Ireland is a weekly television debate and phone-in show. Fair Play, also on BBC Northern Ireland, was a weekly consumer watchdog programme. Mission Employable was a series focusing on helping a group of unemployed people to find their dream career. He has also presented the BBC's Children in Need Northern Ireland broadcast. Since 2008 he has presented Panic Attack, a new game airing on Friday nights in Northern Ireland. The show was repeated nationwide in a daytime slot starting in February 2010.  In 2008 he stood in for Matthew Wright on Five's The Wright Stuff. In 2011, Nolan presented a documentary focusing on the Shankill Butchers. Since 2012, Nolan has hosted a weekly TV version of The Stephen Nolan Show on BBC Northern Ireland every Wednesday.

In 2013, a new series Story of a Lifetime, hosted by Nolan began with episode one focusing on the life of his Radio Ulster colleague Hugo Duncan.

His television and radio shows have been accused of having a pro-Unionist bias and have been referred for impartiality/bias by Ofcom to the BBC. Nolan has defended himself against such claims. 

The BBC released details of the broadcaster's pay for 2020–21 which was up £15,000 to more than £405,000. In the last three (available) years, Nolan was paid over £1m from BBC licence fee revenues.

Awards

In total, Nolan has won twelve Sony Radio Academy Awards. Of these, seven are Gold, giving him the record for the most Golds in the history of the awards. Five of these were awarded during his time with Belfast CityBeat radio, including: UK Speech Broadcaster of the Year 2003 and for his show, The Stephen Nolan Show, The Speech Programme Award of the Year 2006. He also won the Royal Television Society's Regional Presenter of the Year Award in 2005 and 2006, as well as being nominated for the National Presenter Award in 2008.

Personal life
Nolan often discusses starting work aged 12, in a video store while at school. Religion is a regular feature on his radio shows. In 2015, he stated he was an atheist and as a result he issued an apology for breaching BBC guidelines.

In February 2021, Nolan criticised online trolls on Twitter and said: "It's clear I have a weight problem."

Nolan lives in Mahee Island in County Down.

References

External links

The Nolan Show (BBC Radio Ulster)
Stephen Nolan (BBC Radio 5 Live)

1973 births
Living people
Mass media people from Belfast
Alumni of Queen's University Belfast
Radio personalities from Northern Ireland
BBC Radio Ulster presenters
BBC Radio 5 Live presenters
Television presenters from Northern Ireland
British social commentators
British political commentators
British political writers
British political philosophers
Irish social commentators
Irish political writers
Irish political philosophers
British opinion journalists
Journalists from Belfast
Atheists from Northern Ireland